Ismaray Marrero (born 13 August 1982) is a Cuban rower. She competed at the 2004 Summer Olympics and the 2008 Summer Olympics.

References

1982 births
Living people
Cuban female rowers
Olympic rowers of Cuba
Rowers at the 2004 Summer Olympics
Rowers at the 2008 Summer Olympics
Sportspeople from Havana
Pan American Games medalists in rowing
Pan American Games gold medalists for Cuba
Rowers at the 2003 Pan American Games
Rowers at the 2007 Pan American Games
Medalists at the 2003 Pan American Games
21st-century Cuban women